Allerton Cushman (July 27, 1907 – October 25, 2006) was an American rower. He competed in the men's coxed four event at the 1928 Summer Olympics.  He graduated from Harvard University.

References

External links
 
 

1907 births
2006 deaths
American male rowers
Olympic rowers of the United States
Rowers at the 1928 Summer Olympics
People from Chittenden County, Vermont
Harvard Crimson rowers